Tyrell Crosby (born September 5, 1995) is an American football offensive tackle who is a free agent. He played college football at Oregon and professionally for the Detroit Lions.

College career
Crosby missed the season opener of his junior season, but later returned as a starter before his season was ended due to injury.  The injury came in the third game of the Duck's season against Nebraska, where Crosby broke his left foot.  Crosby later announced that he would return to Oregon for his senior season.  This season culminated in Crosby being named to the All-Pac-12 first team. He was also invited to the 2018 Senior Bowl.

Professional career

Crosby was drafted by the Detroit Lions in the fifth round (153rd overall) of the 2018 NFL Draft.

On August 30, 2021, Crosby was waived/injured by the Lions and placed on injured reserve.

References

External links
Oregon Ducks bio
twitter

1995 births
Living people
American football offensive tackles
Detroit Lions players
Oregon Ducks football players
People from Henderson, Nevada
People from Bountiful, Utah
Players of American football from Utah
Players of American football from Nevada
Sportspeople from the Las Vegas Valley